Trade Union Confederation of Burundi (CSB) is the smaller of the two national trades union federations active in Burundi. It is distinct from Confederation of Trade Unions of Burundi (Confédération des Syndicats du Burundi, COSYBU). Both the COSYBU and CSB are affiliated to the International Trade Union Confederation (ITUC).

The CSB was founded in 1991. COSYBU was founded in 1995 after seceding from the CSB, but the two organisations cooperate. In total, 10 of the 59 officially recognised trade unions in Burundi are affiliated to the CSB. In total, the CSB had 5,500 affiliated members in 2014.

According to ITUC reports, labor rights are frequently violated in Burundi and the right to strike is limited. Most Burundians work in the informal economy and members of certain unions have been harassed for their affiliations. It was estimated that only 1.3 percent of the labour force were trade union members in 2014.

See also

Federation of Workers of Burundi (FTB), active between 1963–65
Economy of Burundi
Politics of Burundi

References

Bibliography

Trade unions in Burundi
Burundi
Trade unions established in 1991
1991 establishments in Burundi